Chthon, chthonian or chthonic may refer to:

Fiction
 Chthon (Marvel Comics), an Elder God of the Marvel Universe
 House of Chthon, a major vampire house in Blade: The Series
 Chthon (novel), a 1967 science fiction novel by Piers Anthony
 Chthon (Quake), a boss in the computer game Quake
 Chthon, a DC Comics character who appeared in Justice League Europe
 Chthonian (Cthulhu Mythos), a fictional race created by Brian Lumley
 The Chthonian, a New York City building where "The Brotherhood" met in Ralph Ellison's Invisible Man
 The Chthonians, a major enemy faction from the computer game Grim Dawn
Cthulhu, literature: by H. P. Lovecraft in 1928, chosen to echo the word chthonic.

Other uses 
Chthonian planet, a hypothetical class of celestial objects resulting from stripping away a gas giant's atmosphere
Chthonic, deities or spirits of the underworld in Greek mythology
Chthonic (band), a Taiwanese black metal band
Chthonic, Psychological term: spirit of the nature within 
Allochthon, structural geology: from the Greek "allo", meaning other, and "chthon". Process of the land mass being moved under the earth and connecting two horizontally stacked décollements and thus "under the earth"

See also
Autochthon (disambiguation)